The Men's 3000 metres steeplechase event at the 2011 World Championships in Athletics was held at the Daegu Stadium on August 29 & September 1.

The final was a slow race with Ugandans Jacob Araptany and Benjamin Kiplagat controlling the pace, with three Kenyans immediately behind.  As the last lap began, Kiplagat fell back but Araptany led until one barrier before the water jump.  There Ezekiel Kemboi blasted past, with Brimin Kipruto in tow.  Kemboi had such a substantial lead coming off the last barrier, he started celebrating and drifted out to lane 7 where he finished.  His post race, shirtless celebration dance was one of the most exuberant in recent memory, rivaling some celebrations normally performed by sprinters.  Araptany faded at the finish, passed by Mahiedine Mekhissi-Benabbad for the bronze.

Medalists

Records

Qualification standards

Schedule

Results

Heats
Qualification: First 4 in each heat (Q) and the next 3 fastest (q) advance to the final.

Final

References

External links
3000 metres steeplechase results at IAAF website

3000 Steeplechase
Steeplechase at the World Athletics Championships